Ajuy, officially the Municipality of Ajuy,  is a 2nd class municipality in the province of Iloilo, Philippines. According to the 2020 census, it has a population of 53,462 people.

Geography

Barangays

Ajuy is politically subdivided into 34 barangays.

Climate

Demographics

Religion
The town has many churches namely Ajuy Baptist Church, Ajuy Evangelical Church, Church of the Nazarene, Bible Baptist Church, Evangel Family Church, Roman Catholic Church, Aglipayan Church or the Philippine Independent Church,Emmanuel Riverside Mission Baptist Church ,Bobog Baptist Church, Pinay Espinosa Baptist Church ,Iglesia ni Cristo and Seventh-day Adventist Church.

The town's main source of livelihood is fishing and farming.

Economy

Government

List of former chief executives
Mayors of Ajuy:
Dionisio Diel	                   1916-1918
Roberto Tupas, Sr.             1918-1925
Basilio V. Dignadice	           1925-1929
Juan Q. Dignadice	           1929-1937
Juan Villaruz Centeno, Sr.  1937-1946
Pedro Beatingo Molina	   1946-1955
Jose Dignadice Rojas, Jr.    1955-1978
Jose Tupas Rojas, lll	    1978–1986, 1988-1998
Napoleon O. Dignadice	   1986-1987
Vidal Celis Villaruz, Jr.	   1987-1988
Juan Rojas Alvarez	           2007-2016
Jett Castor Rojas	           1998–2007, 2016–present

Education
The Northern Iloilo State University has an Ajuy Branch located in the Poblacion. Ajuy's central public elementary school is Alejo Posadas Elementary School (APMES), named in honor of the lot's donor. A private elementary school is also in existence, Ajuy Christian Development Academy.

Library
The Island of Panay House of Wisdom library is an open (free use) library located at road 2, Barangay Barrido with more than 2,000 books and updated magazines for reading and research purposes. Pastor Lilianita Dulos and Brendalyn Dulos opened this library for the youth of Panay to help create more empowered Ajuynons youth and high thinking individual.

References

External links
 [ Philippine Standard Geographic Code]
 Philippine Census Information
 Local Governance Performance Management System

Municipalities of Iloilo
Port cities and towns in the Philippines